The M114 bomb was a four-pound U.S. anti-personnel bomb and biological cluster bomb sub-munition. The M114 was used in the M33 cluster bomb.

History
The M114 was a sub-munition for the M33 cluster bomb, as such, it was the first standardized U.S. biological weapon in 1952. The M114 was an improved version of a British World War II-era bomblet that was designed to disperse anthrax.

Specifications
Each M114 held 320 milliliters of Brucella suis.

References

Biological weapon delivery systems
Submunitions
Military equipment introduced in the 1950s